The Little Isabella River is a  stream in Superior National Forest, a United States National Forest in the U.S. state of Minnesota. The stream runs through Stony River Township, which is part of Lake County. The Minnesota Department of Natural Resources has designated it as a trout stream and it is populated with Brook trout.

See also
 List of rivers of Minnesota
 List of longest streams of Minnesota
 Arrowhead Region
 Lake Superior

References

 
 

Rivers of Minnesota